Spendlove is a surname. Notable people with the surname include:

Ben Spendlove (born 1978), British cricketer
Chris Spendlove (born 1984), British footballer 
Randy Spendlove, American record producer, songwriter, and music executive
Richard Spendlove (born 1939), British radio producer/presenter and television writer
Rob Spendlove (born 1953), British actor
Robert Spendlove, American politician 
Ryan Spendlove, British singer-songwriter